A by-election for the Victorian Legislative Assembly district of Williamstown was held on 13 August 1994. The by-election was triggered by the resignation of Joan Kirner, the former Premier of Victoria, on 27 May 1994.

Results

References

Williamstown state by-election
Williamstown state by-election
Victorian state by-elections
1990s in Victoria (Australia)